The Minnesota Golden Gophers women's ice hockey team plays for the University of Minnesota at the Twin Cities campus in Minneapolis. The team is one of the members of the Western Collegiate Hockey Association (WCHA) and competes in the National Collegiate Athletic Association (NCAA) in Division I.

 1997–98 Minnesota Golden Gophers women's ice hockey season
 1998–99 Minnesota Golden Gophers women's ice hockey season
 1999–2000 Minnesota Golden Gophers women's ice hockey season
 2000–01 Minnesota Golden Gophers women's ice hockey season
 2001–02 Minnesota Golden Gophers women's ice hockey season
 2002–03 Minnesota Golden Gophers women's ice hockey season
 2003–04 Minnesota Golden Gophers women's ice hockey season
 2004–05 Minnesota Golden Gophers women's ice hockey season
 2005–06 Minnesota Golden Gophers women's ice hockey season
 2006–07 Minnesota Golden Gophers women's ice hockey season
 2007–08 Minnesota Golden Gophers women's ice hockey season
 2008–09 Minnesota Golden Gophers women's ice hockey season
 2009–10 Minnesota Golden Gophers women's ice hockey season
 2010–11 Minnesota Golden Gophers women's ice hockey season
 2011–12 Minnesota Golden Gophers women's ice hockey season
 2012–13 Minnesota Golden Gophers women's ice hockey season
 2013–14 Minnesota Golden Gophers women's ice hockey season
 2014–15 Minnesota Golden Gophers women's ice hockey season
 2015–16 Minnesota Golden Gophers women's ice hockey season
 2016–17 Minnesota Golden Gophers women's ice hockey season
 2017–18 Minnesota Golden Gophers women's ice hockey season
 2018–19 Minnesota Golden Gophers women's ice hockey season
 2019–20 Minnesota Golden Gophers women's ice hockey season
 2020–21 Minnesota Golden Gophers women's ice hockey season
 2021–22 Minnesota Golden Gophers women's ice hockey season

University of Minnesota
Minnesota Golden Gophers women's ice hockey
Minnesota Golden Gophers women's ice hockey seasons
Minnesota Golden Gophers ice hockey seasons